Aleyda Enid Ortiz Rodríguez (born October 5, 1988 in Bayamón) is a Puerto Rican model, TV host, actress and beauty pageant titleholder who finished as 1st Runner-Up at Miss Universe Puerto Rico 2014 and Miss Intercontinental 2013. She was later crowned Nuestra Belleza Latina 2014.

Pageantry

Miss Universe Puerto Rico 2014
Aleyda represented Bayamón at Miss Universe Puerto Rico 2014 on October 3, 2013 where she finished as 1st Runner-Up to Gabriela Berrios of Toa Baja. Being the 1st Runner-Up she was awarded the opportunity to represent Puerto Rico at Miss Intercontinental 2013.

Miss Intercontinental 2013
Aleyda represented Puerto Rico at Miss Intercontinental 2013 where she finished as 1st Runner-Up. This was Puerto Rico's second consecutive placement as 1st Runner-Up as Ortiz' predecessor Génesis Dávila also placed 1st Runner-Up the previous year.

Nuestra Belleza Latina 2014 
Ortiz auditioned for Univision's reality show and beauty pageant Nuestra Belleza Latina 2014 in Miami and advanced to Round 2 where she was selected to be part of the 12 finalists who enter the mansion of Nuestra Belleza Latina. On May 18, 2014 Aleyda was declared the winner, becoming the third Puerto Rican to do so after Melissa Marty in 2008 and Vanessa De Roide in 2012. She was awarded $200,000 in prizes, a Kia Soul, a contract with Univision Network and appeared on the cover of Cosmopolitan en Español magazine. With her win Puerto Rico currently has the most Nuestra Belleza Latina wins.

Mira Quien Baila 2021

She participated in Mira Quien Baila and she was the runner up with a good price for her charity that she dance for and many fans said she was robbed the win because the audience choose her as their winner while the judge pick Cheft as the winner.

Personal life
From 2014 to 2015 Ortiz was in a relationship with Gabriel Valenzuela. In 2016, Ortiz began a relationship with financial adviser Ricardo Casanova. The couple became engaged in late 2018 and wed on March 22, 2019.

References

External links
 
 

Living people
1988 births
Puerto Rican beauty pageant winners
People from Bayamón, Puerto Rico